Guy David (born 1957)  is a French mathematician, specializing in analysis.

Biography
David studied from 1976 to 1981 at the École normale supérieure, graduating with Agrégation and Diplôme d'études approfondies (DEA). At the University of Paris-Sud (Paris XI) he received in 1981 his doctoral degree (Thèse du 3ème cycle) and in 1986 his higher doctorate (Thèse d'État) with thesis Noyau de Cauchy et opérateurs de Caldéron-Zygmund supervised by Yves Meyer. David was from 1982 to 1989 an attaché de recherches (research associate) at the Centre de mathématiques Laurent Schwartz of the CNRS. At the University of Paris-Sud he was from 1989 to 1991 a professor and from 1991 to 2001 a professor first class, and is since 1991 a professor of the Classe exceptionelle.

David is known for his research on Hardy spaces and on singular integral equations using the methods of Alberto Calderón. In 1998 David solved a special case of a problem of Vitushkin. Among other topics, David has done research on Painlevé's problem of geometrically characterizing removable singularities for bounded functions; Xavier Tolsa's solution of Painlevé's problem is based upon David's methods. With Jean-Lin Journé he proved in 1984 the T(1) Theorem, for which they jointly received the Salem Prize. The T(1) Theorem is of fundamental importance for the theory of singular integral operators of Calderón-Zygmund type. David has written several books in collaboration with Stephen Semmes.

Awards and honors
 1986 — Invited Speaker, International Congress of Mathematicians, Berkeley, California
 1987 — Salem Prize
 1990 — Prix IBM France
 1999 — Foreign Honorary Member of the American Academy of Arts and Sciences
 2001 — Silver medal of the CNRS
 2004 — Ferran Sunyer i Balaguer Prize for the article Singular sets of minimizers for the Mumford-Shah functional. 
 2004 — Prix Servant

Articles

with Ronald Coifman and Yves Meyer: 

with Jean-Lin Journé and Stephen Semmes: 
with Jean-Lin Journé: 

with Pertti Mattila: 

with Tatiana Toro:

Books
with Stephen Semmes: Analysis of and on uniformly rectifiable sets, Mathematical Surveys and Monographs 38. American Mathematical Society, Providence, RI, 1993.
with Stephen Semmes: Uniform rectifiability and quasiminimizing sets of arbitrary codimension, Memoirs AMS 2000
with Stephen Semmes:  Singular integrals and rectifiable sets in Rn : au-delà des graphes lipschitziens, Astérisque 193, 1991
with Stephen Semmes: Fractured fractals and broken dreams. Self-similar geometry through metric and measure, Oxford Lecture Series in Mathematics and its Applications 7, Clarendon Press, Oxford 1997
with Alexis Bonnet, Cracktip is a global Mumford-Shah minimizer, Astérisque 274, 2001
Wavelets and singular integrals on curves and surfaces, Lecture notes in mathematics 1465, Springer 1991
Singular sets of minimizers for the Mumford-Shah functional, Progress in Mathematics, Birkhäuser 2005
with Tatiana Toro: Reifenberg parameterizations for sets with holes, Memoirs of the AMS 215, 2012
with M. Filoche, D. Jerison, S. Mayboroda: A free boundary problem for the localization of eigenfunctions, Astérisque 392, 2017, arXiv:1406.6596
Local regularity properties of almost- and quasiminimal sets with a sliding boundary condition, Astérisque 411, 2019, arXiv:1401.1179

References

1957 births
Living people
20th-century French mathematicians
21st-century French mathematicians
École Normale Supérieure alumni
Mathematical analysts
University of Paris alumni
Academic staff of Paris-Sud University